Alexander Hamilton is a 1931 American pre-Code biographical film about Alexander Hamilton, produced and distributed by Warner Bros. and based on the 1917 play Hamilton by George Arliss and Mary Hamlin. It was directed by John G. Adolfi and stars Arliss in the title role. It follows the attempts of Hamilton to establish a new financial structure for the United States following the Confederation Period and the establishment of a new Constitution in 1787. It is preserved at the Library of Congress.

Plot summary

The story depicts the efforts of Hamilton (George Arliss) to pass the Assumption Bill, which required the federal government to assume the debts incurred by the thirteen rebel colonies during the American Revolutionary War and his agreement to a compromise passage of the Residence Bill, which established the national capital.

Cast
 George Arliss as Alexander Hamilton 
 Doris Kenyon as Mrs. Betsey Hamilton 
 Dudley Digges as Senator Timothy Roberts 
 June Collyer as Mrs. Maria Reynolds 
 Montagu Love as Thomas Jefferson
 Ralf Harolde as James Reynolds 
 Lionel Belmore as General Philip Schuyler 
 Alan Mowbray as George Washington
 John T. Murray as Count Talleyrand
 Morgan Wallace as James Monroe
 John Larkin as Zekial
 Charles Middleton as Townsman (uncredited)

Production
At the time of the events depicted Hamilton was in his thirties (in the opening sequence he is still in his twenties). He is portrayed by George Arliss, then in his sixties.

For the roles of Jefferson and Monroe, Arliss cast two character actors who had built reputations for playing villainous parts. Dudley Digges plays the villainous and entirely fictitious character Senator Roberts.

Box office
According to Warner Bros the film earned $453,000 domestically and $133,000 foreign.

Bibliography
 Robert M. Fells, George Arliss: The Man Who Played God (Scarecrow Press, 2004)

See also
 List of films about the American Revolution
 List of television series and miniseries about the American Revolution

References

External links 
 
 
 
 1893-1993

1931 films
1930s historical films
American biographical films
American historical films
Films set in the 1780s
Films directed by John G. Adolfi
Films set in the United States
Films set in France
Warner Bros. films
American films based on plays
American black-and-white films
Cultural depictions of George Washington
Cultural depictions of Thomas Jefferson
Cultural depictions of James Monroe
Cultural depictions of Charles Maurice de Talleyrand-Périgord
Cultural depictions of Alexander Hamilton
1930s biographical films
1930s American films